José Apolonio Burgos y García was a Filipino Catholic priest, accused of mutiny by the Spanish colonial authorities in the Philippines in the 19th century. He was tried and executed in Manila along with two other clergymen, Mariano Gomez and Jacinto Zamora, who are collectively known as the Gomburza.

Early life
José Burgos, baptized José Apolonio Burgos y García, was born in Vigan, Ilocos Sur on February 9, 1837, to a Spanish officer, Don José Tiburcio Burgos, and a Filipino mestiza mother named Florencia García. He obtained three undergraduate degrees with honors, two master's degrees and two doctorate degrees from the Colegio de San Juan de Letran and from the University of Santo Tomas. He conducted his first mass in Intramuros.

Contributions
Burgos' nationalist views, codified in editorial essays, championing political and ecclesiastic reforms in favor of empowering more native clergymen, made him a target of opposition to civil authorities.

In 1864, an anonymous pamphlet was published in Manila, criticizing the prejudice in the Church, and providing rebuttals against several canards against the native clergy. Although the document was unsigned, historians believe the author to be Burgos, based on its style and content. Burgos also penned several signed articles later in his life, in response to a series of anonymous written attacks on the Filipino clergy. Though Burgos offered few new ideas, his name caught the attention of Spanish authorities, who would report that the native clergy was becoming separatist.

In 1869, Felipé Buencamino, a young student and an acquaintance of Burgos, was charged with spreading nationalist propaganda in the form of leaflets scattered throughout his school's campus, demanding academic freedom. This accusation was given credence by a protest he staged several months  prior, against being required to speak Latin in the classroom. Consequently, Buencamino and some of his associates were sent to jail. With the aid of Burgos, Buencamino was freed four months later, only to be told that having missed school for four months, he would have to find a tutor who would help him make up for the classes he missed. Buencamino chose Burgos.

By this time, Burgos had established a reputation as a defender of the native clergy. His debates over the rights of native priests had extended to include questions of race and nationalism. This reputation would eventually cause him to be implicated in a mutiny in Cavite.

Secret Society of Reformers
José Burgos was a member of a confraternity, which met in the Santa Cruz home of Padre Mariano. It was presided over by José María Basa, and included Agustín Mendoza, Máximo Paterno, and Ambrosio Rianzares Bautista.  The group's goal was to seek reforms, listed in Eco de Filipinas, which was published in Madrid.

Death

After the Cavite Mutiny on January 20, 1872, the trial of mutineer sergeant Bonifacio Octavo revealed that a man named Zaldua had been recruiting people for an uprising. Octavo testified that this man claimed to be under the orders of Burgos, but inconsistent details during Octavo's cross-examinations called into question the validity of his testimony. Nevertheless, governor-general Rafael Izquierdo reported to Madrid that the testimony had confirmed his suspicions, and pinned the blame on Burgos and two other priests, Jacinto Zamora and  Mariano Gomez, for sedition.

On February 17, 1872, they were garroted in the middle of Bagumbayan field (now Luneta Park).

Influence
Burgos was a close friend and associate of Paciano Rizal, José Rizal's older brother and mentor. Burgos's execution - along with Gómez's and Zamora's - deeply affected  José, who was inspired to write his second novel, El Filibusterismo.

Several towns in the Philippines were named in his honor. These include: 
 Burgos, Ilocos Norte
 Burgos, Ilocos Sur
 Burgos, Isabela
 Burgos, La Union
 Burgos, Pangasinan
 Padre Burgos, Quezon
 Padre Burgos, Southern Leyte
 Burgos, Surigao del Norte

In popular culture
 Portrayed by Paolo Paraiso in the official music video of GMA Network's production of Lupang Hinirang in 2010.
 Portrayed by Isko Moreno in the 2014 film, Bonifacio: Ang Unang Pangulo.

References

1837 births
1872 deaths
People executed by ligature strangulation
Colegio de San Juan de Letran alumni
19th-century Filipino Roman Catholic priests
People of Spanish colonial Philippines
People from Vigan
Filipino people of Spanish descent
University of Santo Tomas alumni
Executed Filipino people
19th-century executions by Spain
Ilocano people
Burials at Paco Park